Ariel Behar and Gonzalo Escobar were the defending champions but chose not to defend their title.

Ruben Gonzales and Reese Stalder won the title after defeating Nicolás Barrientos and Miguel Ángel Reyes-Varela 7–6(7–5), 6–3 in the final.

Seeds

Draw

References

External links
 Main draw

República Dominicana Open - Doubles
2022 Doubles